Gift Stanford Joshua (born July 18, 1998) alias Gigy Money is a Tanzanian singer, socialite and internet personality known for her dramatic social lifestyle and relationship controversies.

Social controversies
Gigy Money has been accused, charged and sometimes banned for violating the operating procedure of art activities in Tanzania, using foul language and posting nude contents on her social media.

In 2019 the National Arts Council of Tanzania banned Gigy Money from doing any art activity inside and outside of Tanzania a for six months and to give a sum of one million Tanzanian shillings for the offense of humiliating his personality while performing in a dress that showed her body half naked at the concert that was broadcast live on Wasafi TV which also received a six months punishment from Tanzania Communications Regulatory Authority for the incident.

'The Wife material show'

Gigy Money was one of the contestants of a reality show Wife material season 2 organized by a Kenyan Comedian Eric Omondi, but she was forced out when she had a fight with a fellow contestant from Tanzania called Sumaiyah in a club during the show, she later on accused Omondi of forcing the contestants to fight to get the content.

Relationships
Gigy Money alleged to have had a romantic relationship with Tanzanian singer Ali Kiba, who denied the allegations from the vixen. She once made a public statement on her desire to have childen with singer Diamond Platnumz and a Tanzanian television host, Idris Sultan.

In 2020, Gigy Money had a violent fight with her then Nigerian boyfriend called nicknamed Hunchy Huncho who were separated after the incident. Gigy Money claimed to have a big number of abortions, still she managed to have a daughter she had with her ex boyfriend.

Discography 
Singles
Pressure ft Whozu
Saubona ft Rosa Ree
Sheria ft Sanja Kong
Chombeza ft Lava Lava
Kiki ni Gigy ft Whozu, Sanja Kong
Papa
Malaya
Sasambu
Mimina
Mashine
Genge ft Sanja Kong
Usinisumbue
Changanya ft Tushynne

References

External links

Living people
1998 births
 Tanzanian women singers
 21st-century Tanzanian women singers
 Swahili-language singers
 Tanzanian musicians
 Tanzanian Bongo Flava musicians